Khnapat or Khanabad is a village de facto in the Askeran Province of the breakaway Republic of Artsakh, de jure in the Khojaly District of Azerbaijan, in the disputed region of Nagorno-Karabakh. The village has an ethnic Armenian-majority population, and also had an Armenian majority in 1989.

History 
The modern village was founded in the early 19th century by settlers from the nearby Armenian mountain villages of Jrver and Yereshen. During the Soviet period, the village was part of the Askeran District of the Nagorno-Karabakh Autonomous Oblast.

Historical heritage sites 
Historical heritage sites in and around the village include the nearby ruined village of Jrver (also known as Hanatak) from between the 12th and 17th centuries, the ruined village of Verin Ghlijbagh from between the 12th and 19th centuries 3 km to the west of Khnapat, a 9th/13th-century khachkar, a chapel built in 1224, the medieval cave-shrine of Mets Nan, a 17th-century cemetery, the ruined village of Yereshen from between the 18th and 20th centuries, the 19th-century church of Surb Astvatsatsin, and a 19th/20th-century cemetery.

Economy and culture 
The population is mainly engaged in agriculture and animal husbandry, as well as in different state institutions. As of 2015, the village has a municipal building, a house of culture, a secondary school, a music school, a kindergarten, three shops, and a medical centre.

Demographics 
The village had 827 inhabitants in 2005, and 1,042 inhabitants in 2015.

Gallery

References

External links 

 
 

Populated places in Askeran Province
Populated places in Khojaly District